Huntsville 1996 is a live album by Athens, Georgia's Widespread Panic.  The three disc set is the third release from the Widespread Panic archives.  The performance was recorded live at Von Braun Civic Center Arena in Huntsville, Alabama on April 3, 1996.  The multi-track recordings feature all original band members including late guitarist Michael Houser.

Track listing

Disc 1
 "Better Off" (Widespread Panic) - 5:34
 "Pigeons" (Widespread Panic) - 10:10
 "Let's Get Down To Business" (Vic Chesnutt) - 4:28
 "Radio Child" (Widespread Panic) - 6:08
 "Pilgrims" (Widespread Panic) - 6:41
 "Solace" (Scott Joplin) - 1:39
 "1x1" (John Hermann / Bill McCrory) - 5:07
 "Maggot Brain"  (George Clinton & Eddie Hazel) - 7:59
 "Can't Get High" (Daniel Hutchens / Eric Carter) - 4:28
 "Sandbox" (Michael Houser) - 4:48
 "Papa's Home" (Widespread Panic) - 10:23

Disc 2
 "Diner" (Widespread Panic) - 13:47
 "Porch Song" (Widespread Panic) - 3:39
 "Pleas" (Widespread Panic) - 5:54
 "I'm Not Alone" (Widespread Panic) - 5:55
 "Tie Your Shoes" (Widespread Panic) - 7:56
 "Arleen > Satisfied > Arleen" (Winston Riley/Van Morrison) - 14:18
 "Vacation" (Widespread Panic) - 9:33
 "Drums" (Widespread Panic) - 4:59

Disc 3
 "I Walk On Guilded Splinters" (Mac Rebennack) - 12:10
 "Blackout Blues" (Widespread Panic) - 5:56
 "Contentment Blues" (Widespread Panic) - 6:06
 "Love Tractor" (Widespread Panic) - 6:34
 "Can't Find My Way Home" (Steve Winwood) - 5:51

Personnel

Widespread Panic
 John "JB" Bell - Vocals, Guitar
 Michael Houser - Guitar, Vocals
 David Schools - Bass, Vocals
 John "JoJo" Hermann - Keyboards, Vocals
 Todd Nance - Drums
 Domingo "Sunny" Ortiz - Percussion

Personnel
 Mixed by Chris Rabold and Drew Vandenberg at Chase Park Transduction in Athens, GA.
 Recorded by Tim Wright
 Mastered by Jeff Capurso
 Packaging by Chris Bilheimer

References

External links
 Widespread Panic website
 Widespread Panic Archives Blog

2009 live albums
Widespread Panic live albums